Splash'N Boots is a Canadian children's music duo consisting of Nick Adams (Splash) and Taes Leavitt (Boots). Adams and Leavitt formed Splash'N Boots in 2003 as a class project while studying at Queen's University, in Kingston, Ontario.

In 2014, Splash'N Boots were nominated for their first Juno Award for Children's Album of the Year for their album Coconuts Don't Fall Far from the Tree. They have since been nominated in 2015 for Happy Times, in 2016 for Songs from the Boot, in 2017 for Big Yellow Tunes and in 2018 for Love, Kisses and Hugs and won the award in 2019 for You, Me and the Sea.

In 2007, 2012, and 2014, Splash'N Boots won the SiriusXM Independent Music Award for Children's Artist/Group or Duo of the Year.

Splash'N Boots have a TV series which airs on Treehouse TV.

Works

Albums 
 Getting Our Feet Wet (2003) 
 Manatee Bay (2004)
 Popcorn, Pickles, and Parrots (2006) 
 Razoo! (2009) 
 Back in Yellow (2011) 
 Coconuts Don't Fall Far from the Tree (2012) 
 Keepin' It Green (2013)
 Happy Times (2014)
 Songs from the Boot (2015)
 Big Yellow Tunes (2016)
 Love, Kisses and Hugs (2017)
 You, Me and the Sea (2018)
 Heart Parade (2020)
 I Am Love (2022)

DVDs 
 The Splash'N Boots Show: Act 1 (2008)
 The Splash'N Boots Show: Act 2 (2011)
 Splash'N Boots Act 2.5: A Whole Lot of Music Videos! (2014)

Awards and nominations

Juno Awards

References

External links
 

Canadian musical duos
Canadian children's musical groups
Juno Award for Children's Album of the Year winners